Claude Cyprian Thornton was Archdeacon of Richmond from 1937 until his death on 22 September 1939.

Thornton was educated at Winchester College and Trinity College, Cambridge. Thornton was ordained in 1903. After curacies in St Helens, Merseyside and Bishopwearmouth he held incumbencies in Greasley and Sheffield. During World War I he served with the Royal Army Service Corps. After that he served in South London parishes until his Yorkshire appointment.

References

Archdeacons of Richmond
20th-century English Anglican priests
1939 deaths
People educated at Winchester College
Alumni of Trinity College, Cambridge
British Army personnel of World War I
Royal Army Service Corps soldiers